Long Live the King is an EP by the American indie rock band The Decemberists, released on November 1, 2011, on Capitol. The release is composed of out-takes from their sixth studio album, The King Is Dead. The titles of both combine to create the traditional proclamation, "The king is dead, long live the king!"

Critical reception

Critical reception to Long Live the King was positive. On Metacritic, which assigns a rating out of 100 to reviews from mainstream critics, Long Live the King received an average score of 66, based on 15 reviews, which indicates "generally favorable reviews".

Track listing 
All songs written by Colin Meloy, unless otherwise stated.
"E. Watson" – 3:32
"Foregone" – 4:07
"Burying Davy" – 4:22
"I4U & U4Me" (Home Demo) – 3:38
"Row Jimmy" (Jerry Garcia and Robert Hunter) – 6:40
"Sonnet" (Dante Alighieri) – 2:56

Personnel
The Decemberists
Jenny Conlee – piano, organ, backing vocals, production
Chris Funk – pedal steel, electric guitar, production
Colin Meloy – vocals, drum programming, acoustic guitar, electric guitar, rhythm guitar, tambourine, production
John Moen – drums, tambourine, backing vocals, production
Nate Query – bass guitar, upright bass, production

Additional musicians
Victor Nash – trumpet on "Sonnet"
Adam Schneider – trombone on "Sonnet"
Annalisa Tornfelt – backing vocals on "E. Watson"
Laura Veirs – backing vocals on "E. Watson"

Production
Bijan Berahimi – design
Autumn de Wilde – photography
Carson Ellis – illustrations
Jeri Heiden – design
Stephen Marcussen – mastering
Tucker Martine – engineering, mixing, production

References

2011 EPs
Albums produced by Tucker Martine
Capitol Records EPs
Folk rock EPs
The Decemberists albums